Dithiete is an unsaturated heterocyclic compound that contains two adjacent sulfur atoms and two sp2-hybridized carbon centers.  Derivatives are known collectively as dithietes or 1,2-dithietes.  With 6 π electrons, 1,2-dithietes are examples of aromatic organosulfur compounds. A few 1,2-dithietes have been isolated. 3,4-Bis(trifluoromethyl)-1,2-dithiete is a particularly stable example.

Unsubstituted 1,2-dithiete has been generated in thermolytic reactions and was characterized by microwave spectroscopy, ultraviolet photoelectron spectroscopy and infrared spectroscopy in a low temperature matrix. The open ring isomer, dithioglyoxal, HC(S)C(S)H, is less stable than the 1,2-dithiete.

The dithione can be prepared (as trans-dithioglyoxal) by low temperature photolysis of 1,3-dithiol-2-one. Quantum chemical calculations reproduce the observed greater stability of 1,2-dithiete only if large basis-sets with polarization functions are used.

See also
 Dithietane - the corresponding saturated ring
 Thiete - an analogue with only one sulfur atom

Additional reading

References

Organosulfur compounds
Organic disulfides
Sulfur heterocycles
Four-membered rings